Thomas P. Gottstein (born 1964) is a Swiss banker, and was the chief executive officer (CEO) of Credit Suisse.

Gottstein was born in Zurich in 1964, and is a Swiss citizen. He earned a degree in business administration and economics in 1989, and a PhD in finance and accounting in 1995, both from the University of Zurich.

Gottstein joined Credit Suisse from UBS in 1999.

On 7 February 2020, it was announced that Gottstein, head of the bank's Swiss domestic operations since 2015, would succeed Tidjane Thiam on 14 February 2020.

Gottstein represented Switzerland internationally in golf and finished tied 9th individually and 6th with his team at the 1991 European Amateur Team Championship.

In July 2022, Gottstein resigned from his position and was replaced by Ulrich Körner

References

1964 births
Living people
Swiss bankers
Swiss chief executives
Credit Suisse people
University of Zurich alumni